John Dalzell (1845–1927) was a U.S. Representative from Pennsylvania.

John Dalzell may also refer to:

 Sir John Dalzell, 2nd Baronet (died 1689), Scottish politician
 John Dalzell, 4th Earl of Carnwath (1649–1702), Scottish nobleman and soldier

See also
 John Dalzell Kenworthy (1859–1954), English painter
 John Dalzell Rankine (1907–1987), British colonial administrator
 William John Dalzell Burnyeat (1874–1916), British Liberal Party politician